Gallop Meets the Earth is the first live CD/DVD by Canadian progressive metal band Protest the Hero released on September 29, 2009. The two disc package includes the band's live performance from Toronto, Ontario on audio CD and on DVD in high definition with 5.1 Surround Sound. If pre-ordered, it also comes with a T-shirt and signed Protest the Hero Poster (If pre-ordered in Canada).

The title comes from a line in the song Bloodmeat: "Thus now the fools of god will guard the city of our birth, hold an ear to the ground to hear the sound of clamoring, and horses stammer as their gallop meets the earth."

In March 2010, the DVD was certified gold by the CRIA for selling over 5,000 copies.

Track listing

DVD bonus features
Director's cut with documentary of the set and the whole show day
"Spoils" music video
Whistler Outback ski adventure video
Four live tour videos cut overtop of studio audio tracks
"Wake and Funnel" beer adventure bonus feature
"Stop moshing" bonus feature piece
Protest the Hero show rider access bonus
An angry letter from a fan

References

Protest the Hero albums
2009 live albums
Underground Operations albums